Arthur Jeffery (18 October 1892 in Melbourne, Australia – 2 August 1959 in South Milford, Canada) was a Protestant Australian professor of Semitic languages from 1921 at the School of Oriental Studies in Cairo, and from 1938 until his death jointly at Columbia University and Union Theological Seminary in New York City. He is the author of extensive historical studies of Middle Eastern manuscripts.
His important works include Materials for the History of the Text of the Qur'an: The Old Codices, which catalogs all surviving documented variants of the orthodox Quran text; and The Foreign Vocabulary of the Qur'an, which traces the origins of 318 foreign (non-Arabic) words found in the Qur'an.

Some of Jeffery's studies are included in The Origins of The Koran: Classic Essays on Islam’s Holy Book, edited by Ibn Warraq. They are also discussed in Mohar Ali's The Qur'an and The Orientalists:

Books
Books by Arthur Jeffery include:
The Textual History of the Qur'an
The Mystic Letters of the Koran
A Variant Text of the Fatiha
The Orthography of the Samarqand Codex
Materials for the History of the Text of the Qur'an
The Foreign Vocabulary of the Qur'an
A Reader on Islam

References

1892 births
1959 deaths
Australian Arabists
History of Quran scholars
Australian orientalists